Rhona Torney is a camogie player, winner of a Soaring Star award in 2010 and an All Ireland Intermediate championship medal in 2011.

Other awards
One Junior and one Intermediate County Titles, two Under-16 Ulster Championships, two Ulster U18 Championships, three Senior Ulster Championships, Purcell Cup, Junior National League Division 3.

References

External links
 Camogie.ie Official Camogie Association Website

Living people
Antrim camogie players
Year of birth missing (living people)